A by-election for the seat of Tenterfield in the New South Wales Legislative Assembly was held on 20 November 1884 because of the resignation of Sir Henry Parkes, stating that he was retiring from politics and that "I have no intention of seeking or accepting a seat in any future Parliament".

Dates

Result

Sir Henry Parkes resigned.

Aftermath
Despite Sir Henry's statement that he was retiring from politics, he re-entered the Legislative Assembly at the Argyle by-election on 31 March 1885, and would become Premier for a fourth time in 1887.

See also
Electoral results for the district of Tenterfield
List of New South Wales state by-elections

References

1884 elections in Australia
New South Wales state by-elections
1880s in New South Wales